The 2018 World Financial Group Continental Cup of Curling was held from January 11 to 14 at the Sports Centre at Western Fair District in London, Ontario. The Continental Cup featured team events, mixed doubles events, and skins competitions, and the brunt of the points was in the skins competitions. TSN broadcast the event, as it has in previous years.

North America won the event 30.5 points to 30, with an extra half point awarded in a draw to the button competition between Brad Gushue and Thomas Ulsrud after a 30–30 tie after all events. North America collected CAD$52,000 winner's cheque. World collected $26,000 loser's cheque and $13,000 Sunday skins bonus.

The total attendance for the event was 16,017.

Competition format
This edition of the Continental Cup used a similar format as that of the previous year. Out of the sixty total points available, a majority of points were needed to win the cup. The mixed doubles, and team games were worth one point each, and ties were worth one half point each to both teams. The skins games were worth a total of five points. Nine mixed doubles were played, along with eighteen team games and six skins games.

Teams
The teams were selected from the top teams in each region. Six teams from each region competed against each other in the competition. Four teams from Canada earned the right to represent Team North America by virtue of winning certain events, namely the 2017 Canadian Olympic Curling Trials (which were held in lieu of a Canada Cup of Curling in 2017) and the Canadian National Championships (the Brier and the Tournament of Hearts). Two teams from the United States, namely the top point-getters of American teams on the World Curling Tour, were chosen to represent North America, and the teams representing Team World were selected by the World Curling Federation.

The teams in the table below have been announced as representatives of their respective regions. As Rachel Homan had won both the 2017 Scotties and the 2017 Olympic Trials, Michelle Englot and her team was invited as 2017 Scotties runners-up.

Events
All times listed are in Eastern Standard Time (UTC−5).

Thursday, January 11

Draw 1
Team
9:30 am

Draw 2
Mixed doubles
2:30 pm

Draw 3
Team
7:00 pm

Friday, January 12

Draw 4
Team
9:30 am

Draw 5
Mixed doubles
2:30 pm

Draw 6
Team
7:00 pm

Saturday, January 13

Draw 7
Mixed doubles
9:30 am

Draw 8
Team
2:30 pm

Draw 9
Team
7:00 pm

Sunday, January 14

Draw 10
Skins
2:30 pm

Draw 11
Skins
7:00 pm

Tiebreaker

After all events, Team North America and Team World were tied at 30 points each. The tiebreak was a draw to the button with each team selecting a thrower. Brad Gushue for Team North America won the draw over Thomas Ulsrud for Team World.

References

External links 

2018
2018 in Canadian curling
2018 in Ontario
January 2018 sports events in Canada
International curling competitions hosted by Canada
Sports competitions in London, Ontario
Curling in Ontario